Psychedelia is an early light synthesizer developed by Jeff Minter and published by Llamasoft in 1984. It was converted to the MSX and ZX Spectrum by Simon Freeman.

Usage
Psychedelia allowed a user to generate a light show on the screen grid, using the joystick to send pulses or bursts of coloured squares. There are various preset settings, or the user can manually set the variables controlling the pulses. Patterns can be recorded to memory or tape for later playback.

Unlike Minter's later synthesizers such as Neon, Psychedelia does not use audio as a factor, only using a joystick's input. It is, however, intended to be played in accompaniment to music.

History
Minter had been considering "dynamic interactive pattern generators" but hadn't coded any previously. An idea for an algorithm came to him, in which patterns would be seeded along a path, which would then expand and change shape and colour over time. He coded it in 6502 assembler language, fitting into about 1 kilobyte. Running the code for the first time had a profound effect on Minter: "It just felt wonderfully new, and somehow primal... it was like the patterns and mandalas that have fascinated humans for millennia, but come to life, under your control..."

Originally, Minter intended the algorithm to be public domain and contributed an early version in listing form to a computer magazine. After encouragement from his parents, Minter eventually released an expanded version commercially as Pyschedelia. He continued to develop the light synthesizer concept, designing Colourspace (1985), Trip-a-Tron (1987), Virtual Light Machine (1990, 1994, 2000 and an unreleased version in 2003) and Neon (2004).

Psychedelia, along with other older Llamasoft programs, has since become public domain software. Later the author released a variant for Apple devices including the source code.

Critical reception
On its release Psychedelia received mixed reviews. Your Spectrum criticized the concept of a light synthesizer, describing Psychedelia as boring and awarding an average of 2/5. Sinclair User also only awarded 2 out of 5, finding the concept interesting but concluding that the games-buying public was the wrong demographic for this kind of software. In contrast, CRASH found the package great fun to play around with, describing the effects as fantastic, but criticizing the retail price and narrow appeal. The magazine featured Psychedelia on their October 1991 covertape.

See also
Trip-a-Tron
Virtual Light Machine
Neon (light synthesizer)

External links
Official site at Llamasoft
Disassembled source code for Psychedelia on the C64 at GitHub

References

1984 software
Music visualization software
Llamasoft software
Assembly language software
Public-domain software